The 13th African Swimming Championships were held from 10 to 16 September 2018 at the Mohamed Boudiaf Olympic Complex in Algiers, Algeria and at Boukourdane Lake.

Participating countries

Medal standings

Results

Men

Women

Mixed 

 Swimmers who participated in the heats only and received medals.

References

External links
Official website
Results

 
African Swimming Championships
International sports competitions hosted by Algeria
African Swimming Championships
Swimming Championships
African Swimming Championships
African Swimming Championships
September 2018 sports events in Africa